Neva (also Romanized as Nevā and Navā) is a village in Bala Larijan Rural District, Larijan District, Amol County, Mazandaran Province, Iran. At the 2006 census, its population was 185, in 48 families.

References 

Populated places in Amol County